Carlos Héctor Campos Silva (14 February 1937 – 11 November 2020) was a Chilean footballer. Campos played for Universidad de Chile. He scored 184 goals for the club, and 18 times for the Chile national team. Campos died on 11 November 2020 in Ovalle at the age of 83.

References

1937 births
2020 deaths
Footballers from Santiago
Chilean footballers
Chile international footballers
1962 FIFA World Cup players
1966 FIFA World Cup players
Universidad de Chile footballers
Place of birth missing
1967 South American Championship players
Association football forwards